Gozal Abdal (also Romanized as Gozal Abdāl; also known as Gowzal Abdāl, Gūzal Ābdāl, and Qizil Abdāl) is a village in Ali Sadr Rural District, Gol Tappeh District, Kabudarahang County, Hamadan Province, Iran. At the 2006 census, its population was 711, in 144 families.

References 

Populated places in Kabudarahang County